Mattei is a surname. Notable people with the surname include:

Members of the Mattei family of Italian nobility including:
Muzio Mattei
Ciriaco Mattei (Muzio's nephew)
Girolamo Mattei (Ciriaco's brother and a cardinal)
Asdrubale Mattei (Ciriaco's brother)
Girolamo Mattei, Duca di Giove (Asdrubale's son)
Luigi Mattei (Asdrubale's son)
Bruno Mattei, Italian movie director
Enrico Mattei, Italian public administrator who created ENI
Fernando Matthei, Chilean airforce commander and junta member
Evelyn Matthei, Chilean right-wing politician
Janet Akyüz Mattei (1943–2004), Turkish-American astronomer and former director of the American Association of Variable Star Observers
Ugo Mattei, professor at the University of Torino
Olga Elena Mattei, Colombian Poet
Peter Mattei, Swedish operatic baritone
Stanislao Mattei, composer and priest

Surnames from given names